Live at the 2008 New Orleans Jazz & Heritage Festival is a live album by BeauSoleil avec Michael Doucet, released in 2009 through MunckMix Records.  In 2010, the album earned BeauSoleil the Grammy Award for Best Zydeco or Cajun Music Album.

Track listing

Personnel
The album features the BeauSoleil avec Michael Doucet.  At the time of recording, these members included Michael Doucet, Tommy Alesi, Jimmy Breaux, David Doucet, Mitchell Reed, Billy Ware, Ben Williams.  Also, Eli Kelly & Woods Drinkwater, are credited as engineers in the Grammy Award.

References

2008 albums
Grammy Award for Best Zydeco or Cajun Music Album